Sergey Sergeyevich Voronov (born 10 November 1988) is a former Russian football forward.

Career
Voronov made his professional debut for FC Tom Tomsk on 15 July 2009 in the Russian Cup game against FC Alania Vladikavkaz.

External links
 
 
 

1988 births
Living people
Russian footballers
Association football forwards
FC Tom Tomsk players
FC Smena Komsomolsk-na-Amure players